The Ames family is one of the oldest and most illustrious families of the United States. The family's branches are descended from John Ames, the son of a 17th-century settler of the Province of Massachusetts Bay, and numerous public and private works throughout the U.S. are named after family members, including the city Ames, Iowa and the NASA Ames research center in California.

Origins
The scion of the American Ames family was William Ames who was born in England to John Ames and Cyprian Ames (née Brown) in 1605. The family's earliest known ancestor died in 1560.  It is thought the family's surname was, at some point prior to emigration, changed from Amyas. In the 16th century Amyas was frequently confused with Ames.

William Ames immigrated to Massachusetts Bay in 1638, eventually settled in Braintree, and died in about 1653. With his wife Hannah, he had one son, John, born in 1647.

Heraldry

The heraldist William Armstrong Crozier recorded an heraldic achievement matriculated to William Ames, from an original grant issued by the College of Arms.

Shield
Argent on a bend cotissed between two annulets Sable, a quatrefoil between two roses of the field;
Crest
A rose Argent, slipped and leaved proper, in front thereof an annulet Or

Notable family members
The children of William Ames' son, John (born 1647), included John (born 1672), Nathaniel (1677), and Thomas (born 1681). They, in turn, had a number of notable descendants.

Descendants of John Ames (born 1672)
 Samuel Ames (1824-1875), chief justice of the Rhode Island Supreme Court
 Marcus Ames (1828-1887), chaplain of the state institutions of Rhode Island
 Herman Vandenburg Ames (1865-1935), dean of the University of Pennsylvania Graduate School
 Joseph Sweetman Ames (1865-1943), president of Johns Hopkins University
 Louis Annin Ames (1866-1952), businessman and designer of the City of New York flag

Descendants of Nathaniel Ames (born 1677)
 Nathaniel Ames (1708-1764), almanac publisher
 Fisher Ames (1758-1808), member of the United States Congress
 Nathaniel Ames, (1741-1822), doctor and almanac publisher
 Nathaniel Ames (1796-1835), seafarer and author
 Ellis Ames (1809-1886), member of the Massachusetts General Court

Descendants of Thomas Ames (born 1681)
The descendants of Thomas Ames, known for the Ames Manufacturing Company and Ames True Temper which was the source of their wealth, have principally been associated with North Easton, Massachusetts. Stonehill College maintains the Ames Family Collection, containing documents related to the Thomas Ames branch dating from the 19th to 20th centuries. They were donated to the college in 2000 by Elizabeth M. Ames, and later supplemented by additional deposits from other family members.
 John Ames (1738-1805), military officer and industrialist
 Oliver Ames, Sr. (1779-1863), industrialist
 Oakes Ames (1804-1873), member of the United States Congress
 Oliver Ames Jr. (1807-1877), president of the Union Pacific Railroad
 John Ames Mitchell (1845-1918), architect
 Oakes Angier Ames (1829-1899), industrialist
 Oliver Ames (1831–1895), governor of Massachusetts
 Frederick Lothrop Ames (1835-1893), member of the Massachusetts General Court 
 Winthrop Ames (1870-1937), playwright
 Oakes Ames (1874-1950), botanist
 Frederick Lothrop Ames Jr. (1876-1921), socialite

Family tree 
 John Ames / Susannah Howard
 David Ames
 Oliver Ames, Sr. / Susannah Angier
 Oakes Ames / Evelina Orville Gilmore
 Oakes Angier Ames
 Winthrop Ames
 Oliver Ames / Anna Coffin Ray
 Oakes Ames (botanist) / Blanche Ames Ames
 Oliver Ames, Jr. / Sarah Lothrop
 Frederick Lothrop Ames / Rebecca Blair
 Frederick Lothrop Ames, Jr. / Edith Cryder
 Harriet Ames (1819-1896) / Asa Mitchell (1819-1877)
 John Ames Mitchell

Notes

References

American families
Butler–Ames family